Acleris amurensis is a species of moth of the  family Tortricidae. It is found in Korea, China, Japan and the Russian Far East.

The wingspan is 25–30 mm.

The larvae feed on Populus tremula.

References

Moths described in 1928
amurensis
Moths of Asia